Edmund Franklin Black (May 3, 1905 – October 22, 1996) was an American athlete who competed mainly in the hammer throw.

He competed for the United States in the 1928 Summer Olympics held in Amsterdam, Netherlands in the hammer throw where he won the bronze medal.

External links
profile 

1905 births
1996 deaths
American male hammer throwers
Olympic bronze medalists for the United States in track and field
Athletes (track and field) at the 1928 Summer Olympics
Male weight throwers
Medalists at the 1928 Summer Olympics